Satu is a female given name in Finland, meaning fairy tale. Its nameday is celebrated on 18 October. As of 2012, more than 26500 people in Finland had this name. The names peak popularity was in the 1960s and the 1970s.

Notable people
Satu Hassi, a Finnish politician
Satu Huotari, a Finnish ice hockey player
Satu Levelä, a Finnish long-distance runner
Satu Mäkelä-Nummela, a Finnish sports shooter
Satu Pauri, a Finnish former heptathlete
Satu Salonen, a Finnish former cross country skier 
Satu Vänskä, a Finnish violinist

References

Finnish feminine given names